The men's 110 metres hurdles event at the 2003 Summer Universiade was held in Daegu, South Korea on 25 and 26 August.

Medalists

Results

Heats
Wind:Heat 1: +0.2 m/s, Heat 2: -0.8 m/s, Heat 3: -0.2 m/s, Heat 4: -0.1 m/s

Semifinals
Wind:Heat 1: +1.1 m/s, Heat 2: +0.9 m/s

Final
Wind: -1.6 m/s

References
Results

Athletics at the 2003 Summer Universiade
2003